Charltona diatraeella is a moth in the family Crambidae. It was described by George Hampson in 1896. It is found in India.

References

Crambinae
Moths described in 1896
Taxa named by George Hampson